Caroline Mary "Carol" Gran (née Millard; November 18, 1941) is a former political figure in British Columbia. She represented Langley in the Legislative Assembly of British Columbia from 1986 to 1991 as a Social Credit member.

She was born in Saskatoon, Saskatchewan, the daughter of Charles Richard Millard and Hilda Irene Handbury, and was educated in Winfield, Alberta. In 1970, she married John Arvid Gran, her second husband. Before entering politics, she worked as an ad copywriter in the broadcasting industry. Gran was an alderman for Langley, British Columbia. She served in the provincial cabinet as Minister of Government Management Services and Minister responsible for Women's Programs. Gran was defeated by Lynn Stephens when she ran for reelection to the provincial assembly in 1991. She was a member of the Kelowna City Council as a city councillor from 2005 to 2008. In 2011, Gran ran unsuccessfully for a seat for Kelowna City Council.

References 

1941 births
British Columbia Social Credit Party MLAs
Women government ministers of Canada
Canadian copywriters
Kelowna city councillors
People from Langley, British Columbia (city)
Living people
Members of the Executive Council of British Columbia
People from the County of Wetaskiwin No. 10
Politicians from Saskatoon
Women MLAs in British Columbia
Women municipal councillors in Canada